= 1967–68 Plunket Shield season =

Cricket tournament in New Zealand

1967–68 Plunket Shield
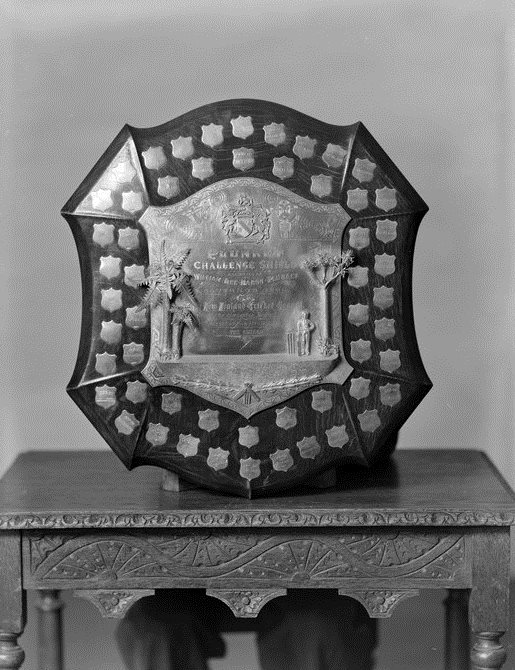
- The Plunket Shield trophy
- Cricket format: First-class
- Tournament format(s): Round-robin
- Champions: Central Districts (3rd title)
- Participants: 6
- Matches: 15

The 1967–68 Plunket Shield season was a tournament of the Plunket Shield, the domestic first-class cricket competition of New Zealand.

Central Districts won the championship, finishing at the top of the points table at the end of the round-robin tournament between the six first-class sides, Auckland, Canterbury, Central Districts, Northern Districts, Otago and Wellington. Ten points were awarded for a win, five points for having a first innings lead in a draw and one point for a first innings deficit in a draw.

== Table ==
Below are the Plunket Shield standings for the season:

Team	Played	Won	Lost	Drawn	Points	Net RpW
Central Districts	5	3	0	2	40	11.885
Canterbury	5	3	0	2	32	9.101
Auckland	5	2	1	2	26	4.110
Wellington	5	1	1	3	21	−0.414
Otago	5	1	4	0	10	−8.149
Northern Districts	5	0	4	1	1	−10.460
